Monroe station may refer to:

 Monroe station (CTA Red Line), a subway station in Chicago, Illinois, United States
 Monroe station (CTA Blue Line), a subway station in Chicago, Illinois, United States
 Monroe station (New York), a former rapid transit station in Rochester, New York, United States
 Monroe Station (Ochopee, Florida), a now-destroyed historic gas station, United States
 Monroe Street station, a streetcar stop in Media, Pennsylvania, United States
 Monroe station (Louisiana), a proposed Amtrak Crescent station in Louisiana

See also
 Munroe station (disambiguation)